The Savoy Theatre was a Broadway theatre that opened in 1900 (for its first few months as Schley Music Hall).  It converted to a cinema around 1910, until it was closed in early 1952 and then demolished.

History

George Krause, a manager of other theatres, with financial backing of Tammany Hall politician Timothy D. Sullivan, built Schley Music Hall at 112 West 34th Street, on the south side of the street, and west of Broadway. The site adjoined the Herald Square Hotel.  It had a frontage of 18 feet on 34th Street, and 50 feet on 33rd Street.  It seated about 840, but the floor chairs were folding chairs.  

It opened on February 26, 1900, aiming to show vaudeville and burlesque fare.  Kraus immediately sold out his stake to New York Yankees owner Frank J. Farrell, and the venue closed on April 29.  Under a new lease by Alfred Aarons, the house reopened on October 8, 1900, as the Savoy Theatre.  Aarons only lasted until early February 1901, and Hyde and Behman then leased it, followed by Charles Frohman and Frank McKee, who started performances on September 21, 1901.  Notable runs included Mrs. Wiggs of the Cabbage Patch (Sept. 1903-Jan. 1905, 150 perf.), and The Man of the Hour by George Broadhurst (Dec. 1906-Jan. 1908, 479 perf.) starring Douglas Fairbanks.

Around late 1910, play performances ceased.  The venue was leased by Walter Reade Sr. (then Walter Rosenberg), who eventually ran a large chain of movie theatres, and became a movie house.  It operated until 1952 (when Reade Sr. also died), and soon the building was demolished.Savoy Theatre, nycago.com, Retrieved 7 December 2020

Selected productions
 Soldiers of Fortune by Augustus Thomas (Mar.-May, Aug.-Oct. 1902)
 The Girl with the Green Eyes by Clyde Fitch (Dec. 1902-Mar. 1903, 108 perf.) 
 Mrs. Wiggs of the Cabbage Patch (Sept. 1903-Jan. 1905, 150 perf.) 
 The Walls of Jericho by Alfred Sutro (Sep. 1905-Feb. 1906, 157 perf.) 
 Mr. Hopkinson (Feb.-Apr. 1906, 113 perf.)
 The Man of the Hour by George Broadhurst (Dec. 1906-Jan. 1908, 479 perf.) 
 The Battle by Cleveland Moffett (Dec. 1908-Apr. 1909, 144 perf.)
 The Awakening of Helena Richie (Sep. 1909-Jan. 1910, 120 perf.)

References
Notes

Citations

External links

NY Public Library photograph

Former theatres in Manhattan
Theatres completed in 1900
Demolished buildings and structures in Manhattan
Buildings and structures demolished in 1952
1900 establishments in New York City
34th Street (Manhattan)
Midtown Manhattan